Nagulapati Srinivasa Chakravarthy, known professionally as J. D. Chakravarthy, is an Indian actor, screenwriter, director, producer, composer, and singer  known for his work primarily with Telugu cinema in addition to Hindi, Tamil, Malayalam, and Kannada films. Chakravarthy made his screen debut with the Telugu film, Siva, an action blockbuster directed by Ram Gopal Varma, featured at the 12th IFFI. He subsequently made his Bollywood debut with the remake of the same film titled Shiva (1990). He then starred in the blockbuster Satya, featured in the Indian panorama section at the 29th IFFI, and was listed among CNN-IBN's 100 greatest Indian films of all time. Chakravarthy received the Screen Award Special Jury Award.

Chakravarthy has starred in more than seventy feature films in a variety of roles predominantly in Telugu, Hindi and a few Tamil, and Malayalam films. He is best known for his performances in box office hits like Neti Siddhartha (1990), Money (1993), Money Money (1995), One by Two (1993), Gulabi (1996), for which he received the state Nandi Special Jury Award, Mrugam (1996), Bombay Priyudu (1996), Anaganaga Oka Roju (1997), Egire Paavurama (1997), Nenu Premisthunnanu (1997), Wife of V. Varaprasad (1998),  Premaku Velayara (1999),  Pape Naa Pranam (2000),  Premaku Swagatam (2002), Madhyanam Hathya (2004), Dubai Seenu (2007), Homam (2008), Arima Nambi (2014),  Bhaskar the Rascal (2015), Mikhael (2019), Ek Villain Returns (2022), Anek (2022), and Dahini - The Witch (2022), Kaari (2022).

Early life 
Chakravarthy was born into a Telugu speaking family of carnatic singer Prof. Dr. Kovela Shantha, and father Nagulapati Suryanarayana Rao. He is born in Hyderabad, India. His elder sister Vijayanthi is settled in the United States. He did his schooling in St. George's Grammar School (Hyderabad), and completed B. E. from Chaitanya Bharathi Institute of Technology.

Hindi cinema
His first Hindi film in a lead role, Satya, was critically acclaimed and became a commercial blockbuster. He also starred in Hindi films like Vaastu Shastra, and Aag alongside Sushmita Sen, and Bhoot Returns alongside Manisha Koirala. He made his film directing debut, with Darwaza Bandh Rakho and anthology film Darna Zaroori Hai got archived at the New York Institute of Technology, New York, America  as part of the film course

South cinema
He debuted in 1989 through Ram Gopal Verma's debut Telugu film, Siva as J.D., as one of the student leaders, and in the same year appeared in a supporting role in the Malayalam film Ennodishtam Koodamo before devoting all his time to films under his mentor's Ram Gopal Varma 's production.

He has worked in many Telugu films directed by ace film makers of the time like Mani Ratnam, Krishna Vamsi, S. V. Krishna Reddy, K. Raghavendra Rao, Kodi Ramakrishna, E. V. V. Satyanarayana, Shiva Nageswara Rao, Gunasekhar, and Vamsy. In 2002, he played a role of Sri Lankan Tamil Eelam fighter Dhileepan, in Mani Ratnam's Tamil film, Kannathil Muthamittal. He has returned to Telugu film industry with his Hit Film "Homam" Both as Director And Actor in year 2008.

He then went on to direct Homam and Sidham. He had a role in director Vishnuvardhan's Tamil film Sarvam, starring Arya and Trisha. In 2016, he has appeared in the Super Hit Malayalam "Bhaskar The Rascal" pairing with Nayan Tara also starring Mamooty.  Then he played a young army officer in another Malayalam film Shikhamani, and made his Kannada film debut with Raavani alongside Pooja Gandhi. He is also directing 3 Kannada films for entertainment factory productions.

Filmography

Telugu films

Other language films

Other credits

References

External links
 
 

Indian male film actors
Living people
Telugu film directors
Male actors in Telugu cinema
Nandi Award winners
Telugu male actors
Male actors in Hindi cinema
Male actors in Malayalam cinema
Male actors in Tamil cinema
Film producers from Hyderabad, India
Film directors from Hyderabad, India
Male actors from Hyderabad, India
21st-century Indian film directors
20th-century Indian male actors
21st-century Indian male actors
Hindi film producers
1972 births